Laura Elizabeth McLaren, Baroness Aberconway CBE, DStJ (née Pochin; 14 May 1854 – 4 January 1933) was a British suffragist, author and horticulturalist.

Life
Her birth was registered in the Salford district of Lancashire on 14 May 1854. She was the daughter of Henry Davis Pochin, a noted industrialist and chemist, and his wife, Agnes (née Heap), a leading women's rights activist.

She married the journalist and Liberal MP Charles McLaren, a business associate of her father's, at Westminster on 6 March 1877. Charles McLaren was later created Baron Aberconway. They had four children. Laura McLaren's two sons became Liberal MP's, Henry D. McLaren for the West Staffordshire constituency and, Francis McLaren for the Spalding constituency in Lincolnshire. Francis married Barbara Jekyll, a niece of the famous garden designer Gertrude Jekyll. He was killed in a flying accident in 1917. Her daughter Priscilla, also a noted activist and suffragist, married Sir Henry Norman and, with him, developed gardens at Ramster Hall, Surrey. Laura's other daughter, Elsie Dorothea, married Edward Alexander James Johns.

Baroness Aberconway was a campaigner for women's suffrage, founding the Liberal Women's Suffrage Union and publishing some writings on the subject. During World War I, she converted her house in London into a hospital and helped run it.

She died in 1933 at her home, Château de la Garoupe, on the Cap d’Antibes.

Awards and honors
In 1918, Aberconway was appointed CBE. She was also appointed Dame of Grace of the Venerable Order of St John.

Other
Outside politics Aberconway was a talented artist and horticulturalist. She and her husband worked to expand and improve the Bodnant Garden begun by her father. Château de la Garoupe is hailed for his beautiful garden.

Writings
 The Women's Charter of Rights and Liberties. London, John Sewell, 1909.
 The Prime Minister and Women's Suffrage London, John Sewell, 1913.

References

1854 births
1933 deaths
Commanders of the Order of the British Empire
Dames of Grace of the Order of St John
English gardeners
English suffragists
British baronesses
Laura
Victoria Medal of Honour recipients
People from Salford